, son of regent Tsunenori with Sanjo Sanetada’s daughter, was a kugyō or Japanese court noble of the Muromachi period (1336–1573). He held regent positions kampaku from 1375 to 1379. He adopted his biological brother Mitsuie as his son.

References
 

1345 births
1397 deaths
Fujiwara clan
Kujō family